The 22nd Mountain Infantry Division (22 DPG) was a pre-war unit of the Polish Army. It was one of two mountain infantry divisions of Poland to fight against the Invasion of Poland of 1939. Currently its traditions are continued by the 21st Podhale Rifle Brigade. Until 1939 the unit was commanded by Col. Leopold Engel-Ragis and was stationed in and around the towns of Sanok, Przemyśl and Sambor.

Along with 11th Infantry and 21st Mountain Infantry Divisions, the 22nd was notable for its distinctive uniforms, based on folk attire of the Górale (Polish highlanders) rather than standard uniforms of the Polish Army. During the Invasion of Poland, the division was attached to the Prusy Army. Overrun by the Germans, the Regiments fought separately in the ranks of other units.

OOB

See also

 Podhale rifles
 Mieczysław Boruta-Spiechowicz
 Polish army order of battle in 1939
 Polish contribution to WWII
 List of Polish divisions in World War II

References 

Military units and formations established in 1919
Mountain infantry divisions of Poland
Military units and formations disestablished in 1944
Lwów Voivodeship